Nikola Tesla is a city suburb situated in Niška Banja municipality in Serbia.

References

Populated places in Nišava District